Vasicine (peganine) is a quinazoline alkaloid. It is found in Justicia adhatoda, after which it is named. It is additionally found in Peganum harmala.

Vasicine has been compared to theophylline both in vitro and in vivo.  It has also been studied in combination with the related alkaloid vasicinone.  Both the alkaloids in combination (1:1) showed pronounced bronchodilatory activity in vivo and in vitro. Both alkaloids are also respiratory stimulants. Vasicine has a cardiac–depressant effect, while vasicinone is a weak cardiac stimulant; the effect can be normalized by combining the alkaloids. Vasicine is reported to have a uterine stimulant effect.

Bromhexine, a synthetic compound imitating the molecular shape of vasicine, is a common ingredient of cough medicine for its mucolytic properties; it increases the production of serous mucus in the respiratory tract which makes the phlegm thinner and less viscous, which allows the cilia to more easily transport the phlegm out of the lungs.

References

Quinazolines
Alkaloids